Osmar R. Zaiane (born April 11, 1965, in Bad Kissingen, Germany) is a researcher, computer scientist, professor at the University of Alberta specializing in data mining and machine learning. He was the secretary treasurer of the Association for Computing Machinery (ACM) Special Interest Group on Knowledge Discovery and Data Mining (SIGKDD) from 2009 to 2012  and treasurer of the ACM Special Interest Group on Health Informatics. He served as the editor-in-chief of the SIGKDD Explorations publication from 2008 to 2010. He was also the associate editor of the same publication from 2004 to 2007.

A former PhD student of Professor Jiawei Han, he did his PhD on knowledge discovery from data at Simon Fraser University.
Since 1999 he has been a professor in the  Department of  Computing Science  at the University of Alberta in Canada, and is the scientific director of the Alberta Machine Intelligence Institute (Amii), formerly known as Alberta Innovates Centre for Machine Learning (AICML), since 2009.
In 2009 he obtained the IEEE ICDM Outstanding Service Award, as well as the 2010 ACM SIGKDD Service Award the following year.
He is a Canada CIFAR AI Chair holder with the Canadian Institute for Advanced Research.

References

External links 
 Osmar Zaiane's academic website
 Academic Genealogy

German computer scientists
People from Bad Kissingen
Academic staff of the University of Alberta
1965 births
Living people
Data miners
Université Laval alumni